La Bâtie-Montgascon is a commune in the Isère department in the Auvergne-Rhône-Alpes region of south-eastern France.

The inhabitants of the commune are known as Batiolans or Batiolanes.

Geography

La Bâtie-Montgascon is located some 20 km east by south-east of Bourgoin-Jallieu and 25 km west of La Motte-Servolex. Access to the commune is by the D1516 road from La Tour-du-Pin in the west which passes through the north of the commune and the village before continuing east to Aoste. The D1075 comes from Veyrins-Thuellin in the north and passes through the hamlet of Evrieu in the commune before continuing south-east to Les Abrets. The A43 autoroute passes through the south of the commune from west to east but has no exit in the commune. Apart from the main village there are the hamlets of Évrieu, Avolin, Trévignieux, and Boutière. The commune is almost all farmland with a few small forests and small lakes.

The Bourbre forms the southern border of the commune as it flows west to eventually join the Rhône near Chavanoz.

Toponymy
La Bâtie-Montgascon appears as La Batie Mongafco on the 1750 Cassini Map and as la Batie on the 1790 version.

Administration

List of Successive Mayors

Demography
In 2017 the commune had 1,919 inhabitants.

Local Culture and Heritage

Sites and Monuments
An Ancient hilltop village
The Chateau de Renodel
A Church from the 19th century

Cultural Heritage
A Living Museum of Dauphinois weaving
A Multipurpose meeting hall (work completed in 2009)

Notable people linked to the commune
 Dr Victor Prunelle (1777-1853). Owner of the Château du Vion, his tomb is in the cemetery at La Bätie-Montgascon. A doctor and politician, he was MP for Isère, mayor of Lyon and of Vichy. He tried to quell the revolt of the Canuts in Lyon (21–24 November 1831).
 Pierre Marion (1914-2000) born in La Bâtie-Montgascon. Heart surgeon, he devoted his life to the development of artificial heart valves
 Gérard Nicoud had a bar-restaurant in La Bâtie-Montgascon.
 Patrick Piot, professional motorcycle driver, born in 1967 at Bourgoin-Jallieu, lives in La Bâtie-Montgascon.

See also
Communes of the Isère department

References

External links
 Dauphinois Weaving Living Museum website 
 La_Bâtie-Montgascon Official website 

Communes of Isère